Sherlock Holmes: The Army of Dr. Moreau is a Sherlock Holmes pastiche novel by Guy Adams, originally published in 2012. It is Adams' second Sherlock Holmes novel after The Breath of God.

Plot
An investigation of several murder victims which appear to be animal attacks leads Sherlock Holmes to Dr. Moreau.

Reception

Publishers Weekly found that the novel provided "more action than deduction" and found the ending to be "over-the-top" but felt that Adams' "obvious affection for the characters will leaving more traditional Sherlockians hoping he'll uses his gifts at recreating them in a less-fantastic narrative." Seattle Post-Intelligencer found the book interesting but warned readers that it "bears little similarity" to Conan Doyle's original stories. British Fantasy Society felt that Adams created an authentic feeling world and summed it up as "Pulp. Schlock. Fun."

References

External links
Guy Adams
The Army of Dr. Moreau at Titan Books

2012 British novels
Sherlock Holmes novels
Sherlock Holmes pastiches
Titan Books titles